Hypatopa phoebe is a moth in the family Blastobasidae. It is found in Costa Rica.

References

Moths described in 2013
Hypatopa